A technical file is a set of documents that describes a product and can prove that the product was designed in accordance with the requirements of a quality management system.

All products that have a CE mark must have a technical file which must contain the information that proves that the product conforms with the EU directives and regulations for CE-marked products. EU enforcement authorities may demand a copy of the technical file for many years after the last product was made. Customers do not usually have access to the technical file.

Content
A technical file is usually based on a document archive system that ensures longevity of documents and can either be on paper or in electronic files. It can include drawings, specifications, reports, review records, meeting minutes, labels, instructions for use, software source code, production process flow charts, etc.  One document may be named "technical file" and list all other documents that are considered part of the technical file but it can be made available to the competent authority on request.

Medical devices
The sub-clause 4.2.3 of ISO 13485:2016 requires a manufacturer of a medical device to establish a technical file (medical device file, device master record, design dossier, or device master file). Annex II and III of the EU medical device regulation (MDR) and of the In-vitro Diagnostic Regulation (IVDR) contain an overview of the contents and structure of a technical file, here called Technical documentation.

See also
 Device Master Record a similar concept in the US for medical devices
 Technical documentation

References
Conformance Ltd explanation about Technical File
United Kingdom HSE explanation of Technical File
U.S. Government export page explaining Technical File

External links
Tolerance Management

Quality management
Regulation of medical devices